The British counter-culture or underground scene developed during the mid 1960s, and was linked to the hippie subculture of the United States. Its primary focus was around Ladbroke Grove and Notting Hill in London. It generated its own magazines and newspapers, bands, clubs and alternative lifestyle, associated with cannabis and LSD use and a strong socio-political revolutionary agenda to create an alternative society.

Beatnik influence
Many in the blossoming underground movement were influenced by 1950s Beatnik Beat generation writers such as William Burroughs and Allen Ginsberg, who paved the way for the hippies and the counterculture of the 1960s. During the 1960s, the Beatnik writers engaged in symbiotic evolution with freethinking academics including experimental psychologist Timothy Leary.

An example of the cross-over of beatnik poetry and music can be seen when Burroughs appeared at the Phun City festival, organised in 24–26 July 1970 by Mick Farren with underground community bands including The Pretty Things, Edgar Broughton Band, Kevin Ayers, Edgar Broughton Band, Pink Fairies, Shagrat, and, from the United States, the MC5.

History

The UK's underground movement was focused on the Ladbroke Grove/Notting Hill area of London, which Mick Farren said "was an enclave of freaks, immigrants and bohemians long before the hippies got there". It had been depicted in Colin MacInnes' novel Absolute Beginners, about street culture at the time of the Notting Hill Riots in the 1950s.

The underground paper International Times (IT) began to appear in 1966 and Steve Abrams, founder of Soma, summarised the underground as a "literary and artistic avant-garde with a large contingent from Oxford and Cambridge. John Hopkins (Hoppy), a member of the editorial board of International Times for example, was trained as a physicist at Cambridge."

Police harassment of members of the underground (often referred to as "freaks", initially by others as an insult, and later by themselves as an act of defiance) became commonplace, particularly against the underground press. According to Farren, "Police harassment, if anything, made the underground press stronger. It focused attention, stiffened resolve, and tended to confirm that what we were doing was considered dangerous to the establishment."

Key underground (community) bands of the time who often performed at benefit gigs for various worthy causes included Pink Floyd (when they still had Syd Barrett), Soft Machine, Tomorrow, Pretty Things, The Deviants (featuring Mick Farren), Tyrannosaurus Rex, Edgar Broughton Band, Hawkwind, Pink Fairies (featuring Twink and ex-The Deviants), Shagrat (featuring Steve Peregrin Took, Mick Farren (early lineup), and Larry Wallis); key people included, in the late '60s, Marc Bolan, who would leave "the Grove" to find fame with T. Rex, and his partner Steve Peregrin Took, who remained in Ladbroke Grove and continued to perform benefit gigs in the anti-commercial ethos of the UK underground.

Within Portobello Road stood the Mountain Grill, a greasy spoon cafe, which in the late 1960s and early 1970s was frequented by several UK underground artists, including Hawkwind and the Pink Fairies. In 1974 Hawkwind released an album titled Hall Of The Mountain Grill and Steve Peregrin Took wrote Ballad of the Mountain Grill (aka Flophouse Blues).

Commentators
Mick Farren said,

Lifestyle
The underground movement was heavily symbolised by the use of drugs. The types of drugs used were varied and in many cases the names and effects were unknown as The Deviants/Pink Fairies member Russell Hunter, working at International Times (part of the underground press at the time), recalled. "People used to send in all kinds of strange drugs and things, pills and powders, stuff to smoke and that. They'd always give them to me to try to find out what they were! [Laughs]".

Part of the sense of humour of the underground, no doubt partly induced by the effects of both drugs and radical thinking, was an enjoyment at "freakin' out the norms". Mick Farren recalls actions sure to elicit the required response. "The band's baroque House of Usher apartment on London's Shaftesbury Avenue had witnessed pre-Raphaelite hippy scenes, like Sandy the bass player (of The Deviants and Pink Fairies), Tony the now and again keyboard player, and a young David Bowie, fresh from Beckenham Arts Lab, sunbathing on the roof, taking photos of each other and posing coyly as sodomites".

Aesthetics
The image of the underground as manifested in magazines such as Oz and newspapers like International Times was dominated by key talented graphic artists, particularly Martin Sharp and the Nigel Waymouth–Michael English team, Hapshash and the Coloured Coat, who fused Alfons Mucha's Art Nouveau arabesques with the higher colour key of psychedelia.

The overground
There was a smaller, less widely spread manifestation from the UK underground termed the "Overground", which referred to an explicitly spiritual, cosmic, quasi-religious intent, though this was an element that had always been present. At least two magazines—Gandalf's Garden (6 issues, 1968–72) and Vishtaroon—adopted this "overground" style. Gandalf's Garden was also a shop/restaurant/meeting place at World's End, Chelsea. The magazines were printed on pastel paper using multi-coloured inks and contained articles about meditation, vegetarianism, mandalas, ethics, poetry, pacifism and other subjects at a distance from the more wild and militant aspects of the underground. The first issue of Gandalf's Garden urged that we should "seek to stimulate our own inner gardens if we are to save our Earth and ourselves from engulfment." It was edited by Muz Murray who is now called Ramana Baba and teaches yoga.

These attitudes were embodied musically in The Incredible String Band, who in 2003 were described as "holy" by the then Archbishop of Canterbury, Dr Rowan Williams, in a foreword for the book Be Glad: An Incredible String Band Compendium (Helter Skelter Books). He had previously chosen the band's track "The Hedgehog's Song" as his only piece of popular music on the radio programme Desert Island Discs). The critic Ian MacDonald said: "Much that appeared to be profane in Sixties youth culture was quite the opposite".

See also
 Counterculture of the 1960s
 Hungry Generation
 James Haynes
 Joe Boyd - White Bicycles - Making Music in the 1960s
 Bomb Culture

References

External links
 The Sound of Ladbroke Grove punk77.co.uk
 International Times official site
 Scans of OZ magazine (archived site)
 Ladbroke Grove sleeve notes from Cries from the Midnight Circus - Ladbroke Grove 1967-78, Nigel Cross
 Joe Beard's biography of The Purple Gang – Taking the Purple contains many references to the underground movement, UFO, IT, 'Hoppy' Hopkins, Pink Floyd, Hendrix, etc
  "Covering the Counterculture - the 60s Underground Press in Pictures" at The Guardian website. 

 
Underground culture
British culture
History of subcultures
Psychedelic rock
Counterculture of the 1960s